Mark Anthony Anelli (born June 5, 1979) is a former American football tight end. He last played on the St. Louis Rams' practice squad in 2007.

Education and career
Anelli attended Addison Trail High school in Addison, Illinois.  He was an honor roll student and a letterman in football, basketball and baseball. In football, he was named the Team's Most Valuable Player, an All-Area selection, and named to the All-State Honorable Mention team. In baseball, he was named as an All-Conference & Area selection.

In basketball, he was named to All-Conference. Mark Anelli graduated from Addison Trail High School in 1997 and attended the University of Wisconsin where he graduated with an Agricultural Business degree.

Collegiate career
In 1998, Anelli would join the Wisconsin Badgers football team. He would win the Rose Bowl in 1999 as a freshman, although he would only catch 10 passes for 78 yards that season. In 2001, as a senior, he would catch 35 passes for 357 yards and 3 touchdowns, playing in 12 games for the Badgers.

Professional career
Mark Anelli was drafted in 2002 by the San Francisco 49ers in the 6th round, 201st overall. He would bounce around between being on the team and being on the practice squad before waived on August 13th, 2003. He would then sign a two-year contract with the Chicago Bears, but would end up on the practice squad again, before being released on August 30, 2004. He would then sign with the New York Giants practice squad, before being released before the 2004 season ended. In 2005, he would sign with the Atlanta Falcons, before being designated to NFL Europe, playing for the Frankfurt Galaxy then waived in final roster cuts. In 2006, he was cut by the Tampa Bay Buccaneers in final roster cuts. 2 days later, he was signed to the St. Louis Rams practice squad. He was released on August 31, 2007.

References

1979 births
American football tight ends
Living people
San Francisco 49ers players
St. Louis Rams players
Wisconsin Badgers football players
People from Addison, Illinois